Tai'an station is a Metro station of Shenzhen Metro Line 5 and Line 7. Line 5 platforms opened on 22 June 2011 and Line 7 platforms opened on 28 October 2016.

Station layout

Exits

References

External links
 Shenzhen Metro Tai'an Station (Line 5) (Chinese)
 Shenzhen Metro Tai'an Station (Line 5) (English)
 Shenzhen Metro Tai'an Station (Line 7) (Chinese)
 Shenzhen Metro Tai'an Station (Line 7) (English)

Shenzhen Metro stations
Railway stations in Guangdong
Luohu District
Railway stations in China opened in 2011